Quasi is an American indie rock band.

Quasi may also refer to:
Quasi, a musical term meaning "almost"
Quasi (fly), a genus of insect
Quasi (sculpture), an artwork in Wellington, New Zealand
Graman Quasi (1692–1787), Surinamese healer and botanist